Kadambur M. R. Janarthanan (22 October 1929 – 26 December 2020) was a union minister of India and a leader of All India Anna Dravida Munnetra Kazhagam (AIADMK). He was union Minister of State, Ministry of Personnel, Public Grievances and Pensions with additional Charge of minister of State for Finance (Revenue, Banking and Insurance). He held these portfolios in Second Vajpayee Ministry from 1998 to 1999.

He was born on 22 October 1929 in Kadambur village in  Thoothukudi district in Tamil Nadu and became science graduate from Presidency College of Madras University. He was agriculturist and trader by profession. He was imprisoned under MISA in 1976 in the emergency.

He was first elected to the Lok Sabha in 1984 from Tirunelveli and then again to the 9th, 10th and 12th Lok Sabha.

Janarathanan was a short story writer and won Odum Railil Oruvan (short story in Tamil) in
Ananda Vikatan short story competition.

References 
http://parliamentofindia.nic.in/ls/lok12/biodata/12tn36.htm
https://web.archive.org/web/20080527051945/http://www.bjp.org/news/profile1.htm

People from Tamil Nadu
People from Thoothukudi district
All India Anna Dravida Munnetra Kazhagam politicians
2020 deaths
Lok Sabha members from Tamil Nadu
India MPs 1989–1991
India MPs 1991–1996
India MPs 1998–1999
Indians imprisoned during the Emergency (India)
1929 births
People from Tirunelveli district
India MPs 1984–1989
Presidency College, Chennai alumni
Union Ministers from Tamil Nadu